The second cabinet of Thabo Mbeki was the cabinet of the government of South Africa from 29 April 2004 until his resignation took effect on 24 September 2008. It was composed of 26 ministers, 10 deputy-ministers and 66 directors-general, for a total of 102 members.

Shuffle

Cabinet

References 

Politics of South Africa
Cabinets of South Africa
2004 establishments in South Africa
2008 disestablishments in South Africa
Cabinets established in 2004
Cabinets disestablished in 2008